Óscar Ortega (born 3 May 1990) is an Argentine footballer who currently plays for Santiago Morning.

External links
 
 

1990 births
Living people
Argentine footballers
Argentine expatriate footballers
Santiago Morning footballers
Primera B de Chile players
Expatriate footballers in Chile
Association football forwards